Jealousy is an emotion.

Jealousy may also refer to:

Film
 Jealousy (1916 film), an American silent film
 Jealousy (1922 film), a Polish silent film 
 Jealousy (1923 film), a Swedish silent film by Victor Sjöström
 Jealousy (1925 film), a German silent comedy by Karl Grune
 Variety (1925 film) or Jealousy, a German silent drama by Ewald Andre Dupont
 Jealousy (1929 film), an American sound film
 Jealousy (1931 film), a British drama film
 Jealousy (1934 film), an American drama film
 Jealousy (1942 film), an Italian film
 Jealousy (1945 film), an American drama film
 Jealousy (1953 Finnish film), a drama film by Teuvo Tulio
 Jealousy (1953 Italian film), a drama film by Pietro Germi
 Jealousy (1999 film), a Spanish drama film
 Jealousy (2013 film), a French film directed by Philippe Garrel

Music

 Jealousy, a 2000s band that included Tila Tequila
 "Jealousy", an orchestral composition by Leoš Janáček, originally intended as prelude for his opera Jenůfa

Albums
 Jealousy (Dirt Band album), 1981
 Jealousy (X Japan album), 1991
 Jealousy (EP), by Loudness, 1988

Songs
 "Jealousy" (Martin Solveig song), 2005
 "Jealousy" (Pale Waves song), 2022
 "Jealousy" (Pet Shop Boys song), 1990
 "Jealousy" (Queen song), 1979
 "Jealousy" (Sparkadia song), 2008
 "Jealousy" (Will Young song), 2011
 "Jalousie 'Tango Tzigane'", a 1925 composition by Jacob Gade, recorded with English lyrics by Frankie Laine (1951) and Billy Fury (1961)
 "Jealousy", by Amii Stewart from Paradise Bird, 1979
 "Jealousy", by Brokencyde from I'm Not a Fan, But the Kids Like It!, 2009
 "Jealousy", by Disciples, 2017
 "Jealousy", by Frankie Miller, 1982
 "Jealousy", by Isabella Manfredi, 2021
 "Jealousy", by Natalie Merchant from Tigerlily, 1995
 "Jealousy", by Paris Hilton from Paris, 2006
 "Jealousy", by Status Quo from 1+9+8+2, 1982
 "Jealousy", by Stereophonics from You Gotta Go There to Come Back, 2003

Other uses
 Jealousy, United States Virgin Islands, a settlement
 Jealousy (horse) (1854–?), British Thoroughbred racehorse
 Jealousy (painting), by Edvard Munch
 La Jalousie (Jealousy), a novel by Alain Robbe-Grillet
 Jealousy (book), by Nancy Friday
 Hey Jealousy, a song by American rock band Gin Blossoms

See also
 Jealous (disambiguation)
 Celos (disambiguation), Spanish term for jealousy